Standings and Results for Group G of the Regular Season phase of the 2013–14 Eurocup basketball tournament.

Standings

Fixtures and results

Game 1

Game 2

Game 3

Game 4

Game 5

Game 6

Game 7

Game 8

Game 9

Game 10

2013–14 Eurocup Basketball